James Lumsden DL (1808–1879) was a Scottish stationer and merchant who served as Lord Provost of Glasgow from 1866 to 1869. He was known as the Knight of Arden.

History
The eldest son of James Lumsden who served as Lord Provost of Glasgow from 1843 to 1846, he was born at 60 Queen Street, Glasgow in 1808. His mother was Margaret Gourlay. He had one younger brother, known as George Lumsden of Drumsheugh Gardens. He was educated at Glasgow Grammar School. James matriculated at Glasgow University in 1821 but did not graduate.

He joined the family publishing and stationery business of James Lumsden & Son, and was made a full partner in 1834. By 1840 he had his own house at 121 Bath Street.

He was chairman of the Clydesdale Bank from 1851 until his death. He was also chairman of the Glasgow and South Western Railway and the Clyde Navigation Trust. He was the final chairman of the Clyde Shipping Company before it was sold in 1857. A Liberal politician, he joined the Glasgow town Council in 1860, serving as Lord Provost from 1866 to 1869. He was knighted in 1868 in a ceremony linked to the laying of the foundation of the new university buildings at Gilmorehill. His title Sir James Lumsden of Arden reflected the estate of Arden near Loch Lomond which he had purchased in 1867.
In later life he lived at 124 Bath Street. He died in Glasgow on 22 March 1879.

References

1808 births
1879 deaths
Businesspeople from Glasgow
Lord Provosts of Glasgow
Liberal Party (UK) politicians
Knights Bachelor
Councillors in Glasgow
Alumni of the University of Glasgow
People educated at the High School of Glasgow
19th-century Scottish businesspeople